Apolipoprotein B mRNA editing enzyme, catalytic polypeptide 1  also known as C->U-editing enzyme APOBEC-1 is a protein that in humans is encoded by the APOBEC1 gene.

This gene encodes a member of the APOBEC protein family and the cytidine deaminase enzyme family. The encoded protein forms a multiple-protein RNA editing holoenzyme with APOBEC1 complementation factor (A1CF). This holoenzyme is involved in the editing of cytosine-to-uracil (C-to-U) nucleotide bases in apolipoprotein B and neurofibromin 1 mRNAs.

APOBEC-1 (A1) has been linked with cholesterol control, cancer development and inhibition of viral replication.  Its function relies on introducing a stop codon into apolipoprotein B (ApoB) mRNA, which alters lipid metabolism in the gastrointestinal tract. The editing mechanism is highly specific. A1’s deamination of the cytosine base yields uracil, which creates a stop codon in the mRNA.

A1 has been linked with both positive and negative health effects. In rodents, it has wide tissue distribution where as in humans, it is only expressed in the small intestine.

Gene 

APOBEC1 lies on human chromosome 12.

Function 

ApoB is essential in the assembly of very low density lipoproteins from lipids, in the liver and small intestine. By editing ApoB, it forces only the smaller expression, ApoB48 to be expressed, which greatly inhibits lipoprotein production. However, A1 is currently found only at extremely low levels in the human liver and intestine, while it is highly expressed in rodents. In humans, A1 is found exclusively in gastrointestinal epithelial cells.

Mechanism 

A1 modifies the cytosine base at position 6666 on the ApoB mRNA strand through a deamination. An A1 dimer first binds to ACF, which forms the binding complex that is then able to eliminate the amine group from cytosine.

ACF binds to the mooring sequence, which puts A1 in position to edit the correct residue.  By converting cytosine to uracil, A1 changes the codon from CAA, which codes for glutamine during transcription, to UAA, a stop codon.  This stop codon yields the much shorter protein ApoB48 instead of ApoB100, as the mRNA is predisposed to transcript.  The editing amount, or expression, of A1 performs is correlated with the insulin concentration in the nucleus, the site of modification.  Tests involving A1 mutants with various deleted amino acid sequences have shown that editing activity is dependent on residues 14 to 35. Like all APOBEC proteins, A1 coordinates a zinc atom with two cysteine and one histidine residues that serve as a Lewis acid. Hydrolytic deamination of the cytosine amine group then occurs, catalyzed by the proton transfer from the nearby glutamic acid residue, and the enzymatic structure is conserved by a proline residue.

Structure 

The structure of A1 relies on three dimensional folds induced by a zinc complex.  These folds allow the enzyme to access the RNA specifically. Deletion tests with mutant strands have shown that residues 181 to 210 are integral to mRNA editing, and there is most likely a beta-turn at proline residues 190 and 191. Specifically, L182, I185, and L189 are integral to the complex’s function, most likely due to their importance to dimerization. Substituting these residues has no predicted impact on secondary structure, so the significant decrease in editing activity is best explained by the alteration of the side-chains, which are integral to dimer structure. Amino acid replacements at these sites deactivated deamination. The C-terminal of enzyme structure is more strongly expressed in the nucleus, hence the site of modification, while the 181 to 210 residues indicate that the enzyme is in the cytoplasm. These are regulatory factors.

Disease relevance 

The low levels of A1 in humans are one reason why high lipid intake is damaging to health. ApoB48 is essential for the assembly and secretion of triglyceride-rich chylomicrons, which are necessary as a response to high-fat intake. ApoB100 are metabolized in the bloodstream to LDL cholesterol, high levels of which are associated with atherosclerosis.  While A1 has a negligible impact on human lipid synthesis, at high concentrations it can be genotoxic. Its diffusion toward the nucleic membrane can lead it to mutate DNA sequences that are actively transcribed on the genome.  In single growth assays, A1 has been found to impact HIV replications. Additionally, A1 has reduced Hepatitis B virus (HBV) DNA replication, although the mechanism is still not known. The antiviral properties of A1 extend to both DNA and RNA due to its deamination function, which can hinder DNA replication and consequently suppress further infection by HIV or HBV. A pan-cancer study shows that A1 mRNA level is associated with adverse prognosis as well as higher rate of the human genomic insertions and deletions (indels), particularly in-frame ones, which proposes its endogenous mutator activity.  There has also been evidence that A1 also edits at NF1, related to tumors in nerve cells.

Interactions 

APOBEC1 has been shown to interact with:
 ACF 
 BAG4, and
 SYNCRIP.

See also

References

External links

Further reading 

 
 
 
 
 
 
 
 
 
 
 
 
 
 
 
 
 
 
 
 

EC 3.5.4